In mathematics, specifically set theory, the continuum hypothesis (abbreviated CH) is a hypothesis about the possible sizes of infinite sets. It states that

or equivalently, that

In Zermelo–Fraenkel set theory with the axiom of choice (ZFC), this is equivalent to the following equation in aleph numbers: , or even shorter with beth numbers: .

The continuum hypothesis was advanced by Georg Cantor in 1878, and establishing its truth or falsehood is the first of Hilbert's 23 problems presented in 1900. The answer to this problem is independent of ZFC, so that either the continuum hypothesis or its negation can be added as an axiom to ZFC set theory, with the resulting theory being consistent if and only if ZFC is consistent. This independence was proved in 1963 by Paul Cohen, complementing earlier work by Kurt Gödel in 1940.

The name of the hypothesis comes from the term the continuum for the real numbers.

The problem is one of the most important problems in mathematics.

History
Cantor believed the continuum hypothesis to be true and for many years tried in vain to prove it. It became the first on David Hilbert's list of important open questions that was presented at the International Congress of Mathematicians in the year 1900 in Paris. Axiomatic set theory was at that point not yet formulated. 
Kurt Gödel proved in 1940 that the negation of the continuum hypothesis, i.e., the existence of a set with intermediate cardinality, could not be proved in standard set theory. The second half of the independence of the continuum hypothesis – i.e., unprovability of the nonexistence of an intermediate-sized set – was proved in 1963 by Paul Cohen.

Cardinality of infinite sets

Two sets are said to have the same cardinality or cardinal number if there exists a bijection (a one-to-one correspondence) between them. Intuitively, for two sets S and T to have the same cardinality means that it is possible to "pair off" elements of S with elements of T in such a fashion that every element of S is paired off with exactly one element of T and vice versa. Hence, the set {banana, apple, pear} has the same cardinality as {yellow, red, green}.

With infinite sets such as the set of integers or rational numbers, the existence of a bijection between two sets becomes more difficult to demonstrate. The rational numbers seemingly form a counterexample to the continuum hypothesis: the integers form a proper subset of the rationals, which themselves form a proper subset of the reals, so intuitively, there are more rational numbers than integers and more real numbers than rational numbers.  However, this intuitive analysis is flawed; it does not take proper account of the fact that all three sets are infinite.  It turns out the rational numbers can actually be placed in one-to-one correspondence with the integers, and therefore the set of rational numbers is the same size (cardinality) as the set of integers: they are both countable sets.

Cantor gave two proofs that the cardinality of the set of integers is strictly smaller than that of the set of real numbers (see Cantor's first uncountability proof and Cantor's diagonal argument). His proofs, however, give no indication of the extent to which the cardinality of the integers is less than that of the real numbers. Cantor proposed the continuum hypothesis as a possible solution to this question.

The continuum hypothesis states that the set of real numbers has minimal possible cardinality which is greater than the cardinality of the set of integers.

Independence from ZFC
The independence of the continuum hypothesis (CH) from Zermelo–Fraenkel set theory (ZF) follows from combined work of Kurt Gödel  and Paul Cohen.

Gödel showed that CH cannot be disproved from ZF, even if the axiom of choice (AC) is adopted (making ZFC). Gödel's proof shows that CH and AC both hold in the constructible universe L, an inner model of ZF set theory, assuming only the axioms of ZF.  The existence of an inner model of ZF in which additional axioms hold shows that the additional axioms are consistent with ZF, provided ZF itself is consistent. The latter condition cannot be proved in ZF itself, due to Gödel's incompleteness theorems, but is widely believed to be true and can be proved in stronger set theories.

Cohen showed that CH cannot be proven from the ZFC axioms, completing the overall independence proof.  To prove his result, Cohen developed the method of forcing, which has become a standard tool in set theory.  Essentially, this method begins with a model of ZF in which CH holds, and constructs another model which contains more sets than the original, in a way that CH does not hold in the new model. Cohen was awarded the Fields Medal in 1966 for his proof.

The independence proof just described shows that CH is independent of ZFC. Further research has shown that CH is independent of all known large cardinal axioms in the context of ZFC. Moreover, it has been shown that the cardinality of the continuum can be any cardinal consistent with König's theorem.

The continuum hypothesis is closely related to many statements in analysis, point set topology and measure theory. As a result of its independence, many substantial conjectures in those fields have subsequently been shown to be independent as well.

The independence from ZFC means that proving or disproving the CH within ZFC is impossible.  However, Gödel and Cohen's negative results are not universally accepted as disposing of all interest in the continuum hypothesis. Hilbert's problem remains an active topic of research; see Woodin and Peter Koellner for an overview of the current research status.

The continuum hypothesis was not the first statement shown to be independent of ZFC. An immediate consequence of Gödel's incompleteness theorem, which was published in 1931, is that there is a formal statement (one for each appropriate Gödel numbering scheme) expressing the consistency of ZFC that is independent of ZFC, assuming that ZFC is consistent. The continuum hypothesis and the axiom of choice were among the first mathematical statements shown to be independent of ZF set theory.

Arguments for and against the continuum hypothesis
Gödel believed that CH is false, and that his proof that CH is consistent with ZFC only shows that the Zermelo–Fraenkel axioms do not adequately characterize the universe of sets.  Gödel was a platonist  and therefore had no problems with asserting the truth and falsehood of statements independent of their provability. Cohen, though a formalist, also tended towards rejecting CH.

Historically, mathematicians who favored a "rich" and "large" universe of sets were against CH, while those favoring a "neat" and "controllable" universe favored CH. Parallel arguments were made for and against the axiom of constructibility, which implies CH. More recently, Matthew Foreman has pointed out that ontological maximalism can actually be used to argue in favor of CH, because among models that have the same reals, models with "more" sets of reals have a better chance of satisfying CH.

Another viewpoint is that the conception of set is not specific enough to determine whether CH is true or false. This viewpoint was advanced as early as 1923 by Skolem, even before Gödel's first incompleteness theorem. Skolem argued on the basis of what is now known as Skolem's paradox, and it was later supported by the independence of CH from the axioms of ZFC since these axioms are enough to establish the elementary properties of sets and cardinalities. In order to argue against this viewpoint, it would be sufficient to demonstrate new axioms that are supported by intuition and resolve CH in one direction or another. Although the axiom of constructibility does resolve CH, it is not generally considered to be intuitively true any more than CH is generally considered to be false.

At least two other axioms have been proposed that have implications for the continuum hypothesis, although these axioms have not currently found wide acceptance in the mathematical community. In 1986, Chris Freiling presented an argument against CH by showing that the negation of CH is equivalent to Freiling's axiom of symmetry, a statement derived by arguing from particular intuitions about probabilities. Freiling believes this axiom is "intuitively true" but others have disagreed.

A difficult argument against CH developed by W. Hugh Woodin has attracted considerable attention since the year 2000. Foreman does not reject Woodin's argument outright but urges caution. The Star axiom was bolstered by an independent May 2021 proof showing the Star axiom can be derived from a variation of Martin's maximum. However, Woodin stated in the 2010s that he now instead believes CH to be true, based on his belief in his new "ultimate L" conjecture.

Solomon Feferman has argued that CH is not a definite mathematical problem.  He proposes a theory of "definiteness" using a semi-intuitionistic subsystem of ZF that accepts classical logic for bounded quantifiers but uses intuitionistic logic for unbounded ones, and suggests that a proposition  is mathematically "definite" if the semi-intuitionistic theory can prove .  He conjectures that CH is not definite according to this notion, and proposes that CH should, therefore, be considered not to have a truth value. Peter Koellner wrote a critical commentary on Feferman's article.

Joel David Hamkins proposes a multiverse approach to set theory and argues that "the continuum hypothesis is settled on the multiverse view by our extensive knowledge about how it behaves in the multiverse, and, as a result, it can no longer be settled in the manner formerly hoped for". In a related vein, Saharon Shelah wrote that he does "not agree with the pure Platonic view that the interesting problems in set theory can be decided, that we just have to discover the additional axiom. My mental picture is that we have many possible set theories, all conforming to ZFC".

The generalized continuum hypothesis
That is, for any infinite cardinal  there is no cardinal  such that . GCH is equivalent to:
 for every ordinal  (occasionally called Cantor's aleph hypothesis).

The beth numbers provide an alternate notation for this condition:  for every ordinal . The continuum hypothesis is the special case for the ordinal . GCH was first suggested by Philip Jourdain. For the early history of GCH, see Moore.

Like CH, GCH is also independent of ZFC, but Sierpiński proved that ZF + GCH implies the axiom of choice (AC) (and therefore the negation of the axiom of determinacy, AD), so choice and GCH are not independent in ZF; there are no models of ZF in which GCH holds and AC fails. To prove this, Sierpiński showed GCH implies that every cardinality n is smaller than some aleph number, and thus can be ordered.

Kurt Gödel showed that GCH is a consequence of ZF + V=L (the axiom that every set is constructible relative to the ordinals), and is therefore consistent with ZFC. As GCH implies CH, Cohen's model in which CH fails is a model in which GCH fails, and thus GCH is not provable from ZFC. W. B. Easton used the method of forcing developed by Cohen to prove Easton's theorem, which shows it is consistent with ZFC for arbitrarily large cardinals  to fail to satisfy . Much later, Foreman and Woodin proved that (assuming the consistency of very large cardinals) it is consistent that  holds for every infinite cardinal . Carmi Merimovich showed that, for each n ≥ 1, it is consistent with ZFC that for each κ, 2κ is the nth successor of κ. On the other hand, László Patai proved that if γ is an ordinal and for each infinite cardinal κ, 2κ is the γth successor of κ, then γ is finite.

For any infinite sets A and B, if there is an injection from A to B then there is an injection from subsets of A to subsets of B. Thus for any infinite cardinals A and B,  . If A and B are finite, the stronger inequality  holds. GCH implies that this strict, stronger inequality holds for infinite cardinals as well as finite cardinals.

Implications of GCH for cardinal exponentiation
Although the generalized continuum hypothesis refers directly only to cardinal exponentiation with 2 as the base, one can deduce from it the values of cardinal exponentiation  in all cases. GCH implies that:
 when α ≤ β+1;

The first equality (when α ≤ β+1) follows from:
 , while:
 ;

The third equality (when β+1 < α and ) follows from:
, by König's theorem, while:

See also
Absolute Infinite
Beth number
Cardinality
Ω-logic
Wetzel's problem

References

Sources

Further reading
 
 
 
 Gödel, K.: What is Cantor's Continuum Problem?, reprinted in Benacerraf and Putnam's collection Philosophy of Mathematics, 2nd ed., Cambridge University Press, 1983. An outline of Gödel's arguments against CH.
 Martin, D. (1976). "Hilbert's first problem: the continuum hypothesis," in Mathematical Developments Arising from Hilbert's Problems, Proceedings of Symposia in Pure Mathematics XXVIII, F. Browder, editor. American Mathematical Society, 1976, pp. 81–92.

External links

Forcing (mathematics)
Independence results
Basic concepts in infinite set theory
Hilbert's problems
Infinity
Hypotheses
Cardinal numbers